Ethan du Preez (born 9 June 2003) is a South African swimmer. He competed in the 2020 Summer Olympics in the 200 metre butterfly event.

References

2003 births
Living people
Sportspeople from Cape Town
Swimmers at the 2020 Summer Olympics
South African male swimmers
Olympic swimmers of South Africa
Swimmers at the 2018 Summer Youth Olympics
21st-century South African people